Phi Mu Delta is a small, national fraternity founded on March 1, 1918 at the Universities of Connecticut, New Hampshire, and Vermont. The fraternity is focused on the ideals of democracy, service, and brotherhood.

History 
Phi Mu Delta was originally derived from the National Federation of Commons Clubs (NFCC), which had formed at Wesleyan University in 1899. Rumblings of interest toward forming a Greek letter organization were the subject of extensive correspondence between chapters in 1917 and 1918. Clarence Dexter Pierce, one of the fraternity's founders, petitioned the NFCC to form a Greek letter fraternity at its 1918 NFCC meeting. His intent was to bring all 19 active Commons Clubs chapters into this new organization which he had named Phi Mu Delta. These were the University of Vermont, the University of New Hampshire, the University of Connecticut and Union College. But upon their return, alumni of Union College's Commons Club, upon hearing the news refused to allow their undergraduate chapter to join. Thus today, the Fraternity recognizes three founding chapters:
 Nu Alpha - Connecticut
 Nu Beta - New Hampshire
 Nu Gamma - Vermont

These three drew lots to determine which would be named as the Alpha chapter; the Greek letter Nu was a reference to their New England region.

Phi Mu Delta became a junior member of the North American Interfraternity Conference (NIC) in 1923, and then a senior member in 1930. It remains a member of the NIC today.

The fraternity expanded slowly during the 1920s, merging or expanding to seven additional chapters by 1930. Expansion of the Fraternity was slowed during the great depression. Phi Mu Delta merged with another fraternity, Delta Alpha Pi in 1934-1935, gaining three chapters, all of which closed shortly afterward. In 1936 one of the founding chapters, the University of Vermont, also closed. By the end of World War II, the Connecticut chapter had also closed.

After WWII the fraternity expanded more rapidly, coinciding with a general increase in fraternity enrollment. This trend petered out by the late 1960s, and by the late 1970s the organization was making plans to shut down. A reorganization effort centered on the State College, Pennsylvania chapter, stabilized the fraternity, and prompted a resurgence in growth. It was at this time that the University of Vermont was recolonized. In the early 1980s, the organization rewrote its constitution. During the 1980s, the fraternity only gained one chapter (California University of Pennsylvania).

Since then the fraternity has expanded steadily. In 2006, the fraternity established an Executive Director position.  In 2015, the National Office was moved to Westmont, New Jersey.

Symbolism and traditions 
March 1 is celebrated each year as Founders' Day.

The coat of arms displays a lion bearing a shield, under which runs a ribbon with the Greek letters of the fraternity's name.

The new member pin is a simple triangle, with three sections, each bearing one of the three colors of the fraternity along with the scales of justice.

The colors of the fraternity are Princeton orange, black and white.

The flower of the fraternity is the jonquil.

The fraternity's new member manual is titled, The Oracle, and was first published in 1998. Its current edition was published in 2018.

Chapters 
List of Phi Mu Delta chapters

Notable members 
Some of the notable members of the fraternity include:
Roger Blough (1904 – 1985) – Chairman of US Steel Corporation
Bill Gardner (b. 1948) – Secretary of State, New Hampshire
Dan Gwadosky (1954 – 2011) – former Secretary of State, Maine; Speaker of the House of Representatives
Tyler Hinman (b. 1984) - six-time winner of the American Crossword Puzzle Tournament and software developer
Theodore H. Kattouf (b. 1946) – former US Ambassador to United Arab Emirates and Syria
Chuck Mather  (1915 – 2006) – former football coach for the University of Kansas
Dick Muri (b. 1953) – Pierce County, Washington council member; former US Congressional candidate
John Rigas (b. 1924) – former CEO of Adelphia Communications Corporation; former majority franchise owner of the Buffalo Sabres (NHL); convicted of fraud
Robert Rounseville (1914 – 1974) – tenor on Broadway and in opera
George Wiley (1931 – 1973) – civil rights leader; chemist
Harrison Richardson (1930 - 2009) - American lawyer and politician from Maine
Jim Hazlett (1926 - 2010) - American sports figure who was head football and baseball head coach for several universities in the northeastern United States
Frank Burrill (1906 - 2001) - Archbishop of Chicago for the Episcopal Church
Peter George Peterson (b.1926) - businessman, investment banker, philanthropist, and author, who served as United States Secretary of Commerce in the Nixon Administration
Leon J. LaPorte (b.1946) - is a retired United States Army General who served as Commander, 1st Cavalry Division from 1995 through 1997 and as Commander, United States Forces Korea until 2006.

References 

 
1918 establishments in the United States
North American Interfraternity Conference
Student organizations established in 1918